Varon or Varón is a surname. Notable people with the surname include:

Adriana Salazar Varón (born 1963), Colombian chess master
Ben Varon (born 1983), Finnish guitarist
Nino Nahman Varon (born 1944), Turkish Musician & Producer
Elizabeth R. Varon (born 1963), American historian
Keith Varon, American musician
Lisa Marie Varon (born 1971), American professional wrestler, bodybuilder and fitness competitor
Melissa Varón (born 1987), Colombian model
Moshe Varon (1926–2007), Israeli footballer and manager
Yineth Varón (born 1982), Colombian footballer

See also
Yunis–Varon syndrome, congenital disorder